

The Dayton-Wright T-4 Messenger was a light, single-seat reconnaissance aircraft built in the United States by the Dayton-Wright Company in 1918 in the hope of gaining a production contract from the United States Army. It was a small conventional single-bay biplane with a neatly streamlined fuselage and staggered, equal-span wings. The undercarriage was of fixed tailskid type and the pilot sat in an open cockpit. Although diminutive, the design in fact started life as a scaled-up version of the Dayton-Wright Bug and shared a family resemblance to the de Havilland DH.4 that Dayton-Wright was building under licence during World War I. When the US Army was not interested in the aircraft, plans were made to sell it on the civil market, but these came to nothing and the prototype was the only example ever built.

Specifications

See also

References

Citations

Bibliography

 
 
 

Messenger
1910s United States military reconnaissance aircraft
Single-engined tractor aircraft
Biplanes
Aircraft first flown in 1918